Trashion (a portmanteau of trash and fashion) is a term for art, jewellery, fashion and objects for the home created from used, thrown-out, found and repurposed elements.  The term was first coined in New Zealand in 2004 and gained in usage through 2005. Trashion is a subgenre of found object art, which is basically using objects that already have some other defined purpose, and turning it into art. In this case, trash is used.

Initially trashion was used to describe art-couture costume usually linked to contests or fashion shows; however, as recycling and 'green' fashion have become more prevalent, trashion has taken a turn for the more wearable.  The term is now widely used in creative circles to describe any wearable item or accessory that is constructed using all or part materials recycled materials, including clothing that has been thrifted and reconditioned.

Philosophy

Trashion is a philosophy and an ethic encompassing environmentalism and innovation. Making traditional objects out of recycled materials can be trashion, as can making avant-garde fashion from cast-offs or junk. It springs from a desire to make the best use of limited resources. Trashion is similar to upcycling and refashion, although it began with specific fashion aspirations.  Like upcycling, trashion generates items that are valued again, but these items may be either low-cost or high-cost. The environmental aim of trashion is to call attention to and reduce the polluting outcome of fashion waste.

History
Indigenous people throughout the world have used salvaged materials to create new objects for an indeterminate number of years.  Africans have made bags from rice and juice packets, Haitians have made sculptural jewelry from old oil cans, and American settlers have made quilts and rugs from cast-off clothing and feed sacks.  People were making something from nothing long before the word "trashion" was coined; however, Trashion usually refers to "making something from nothing" for aesthetic purposes, not for practical use.

Trashion has become a style of art since the 1990s. Trashion is also the subject of school projects, local fashion shows, community center exhibits, and fundraisers, among other purposes. Some contemporary trashion artists include Marina DeBris  and Nancy Judd.

References 

 
Recycling
Fashion
2000s neologisms